= Carlos Biggeri =

Argentine mathematician (1908–1965)

Carlos Biggeri (1908–1965) was an Argentine mathematician who won several prestigious awards including the Association of Culture of Argentina, the Faculty of Science of Madrid (Spain) and the Institution Mitre.
